Global Warfare was a social strategy game produced by Kabam Inc. It is no longer available to play.

History
The game was open for beta on March 18, 2011 and was released on May 3, 2011 for social networking sites Google+ and Facebook. On November 1, 2012 it was announced the game was shutting down on November 30.

Gameplay
Global Warfare is set in a near-future world of warring city-states. As a General, players are in charge of their own city-state and army. Players can establish alliances to assist in rebuilding their cities and battling for global domination. Each city has been destroyed by war, the player has six days to rebuild the city's defences, research upgrades and enable the production of advanced armies. A seven-day grace period is given when players start a new game. This period is used to prepare for war and establish alliances. One the grace period is over the player's city becomes a potential target for attack but the player can launch attacks of their own.

The game places emphasis on building alliances with other players, those who fail to form alliances are vulnerable to massed attack from multiple rival players. Alliances can attempt to capture resources as a group, or send reinforcements should one of their number come under attack from a rival.

Reception
Nicole Tanner of IGN notes that Kabam's experience with their previous titles allowed them to "perfect the formula". However, she points out lack of story and similarity with developer's previous titles. Jeremiah Leif Johnson of Gamezebo also points out that while the game is good, it is very similar to the previous titles. Both Tanner and Johnson criticize the strategy aspect for the lack of low-level unit control.

References

External links 
Global Warfare on Kabam.com

2011 video games
Facebook games
Social casual games
Video games with isometric graphics
Products and services discontinued in 2012
Inactive massively multiplayer online games
Kabam games